Nondescripts Rugby Football Club (also known as Nondies) is a Kenyan rugby club based in Nairobi. The club is the oldest in Kenya, and was founded in 1923 after the splitting of the Nairobi rugby club. The club 1st XV compete in the KRU Championship , while the 2nd XV compete in the Eric Shirley Shield. At the end of the now-defunct Nairobi District Championship, they had the most wins with 19.
The Nondescripts have a long-lasting history with the social rugby team Les Gaulois, a French-initiated team.

Notable players

Kenya 7's 
Biko Adema
Benedict Nyambu
Oscar Dennis
Ken Moseti
Gray Cullen
Charles Kanyi

Kenya XV
Charles Kanyi
Mike Aung
Jay Williams
Bobby Oyugi
Gray Cullen
Ronnie Mwenesi
Sospeter Nyagwa

Other key 1st XV players
Gray Cullen
Moses Wanyaga
Kanyi Gitonga
Charles Kanyi
Anthony Shihemi
Alan Hicks
Mike Aung
Michael Kimani
Auka Gecheo
Shaka Kwach
Thomas Opiyo
Joseph Wachira
Clive Akello
George Kanyi
Madi Jimba Yahya
Cedric Odera
Covince Kiziri
Godfrey Oyare
Ombachi E Ondari
Jeff Otieno
Ian Mumbwani
Wesley Odhiambo
Neil McRae
Steven Odhiambo
Oswaga Issac

References

External links
 Nondescripts RFC official site

Kenyan rugby union teams
Sport in Nairobi